"Just a Groove" is a song by English dance music group Nomad, released in 1991 as the third single from their only album, Changing Cabins (1991). It was a top 10 hit in Belgium, Greece, the Netherlands and Switzerland. In the UK, it peaked at number 16, while on the Eurochart Hot 100, it reached number 25 in May 1991.

Critical reception
Pop Rescue felt that "this is certainly a funky sounding song and somewhat different from the album’s lead single". Phil Cheeseman from Record Mirror wrote, "It's got a rolling beat, the odd burst of saxophone, a rap halfway through and most important of all, those crowd noises to kick it off. Another remix of 'Devotion'? Well, in a way. 'Just A Groove' is the brand new single from Nomad, who evidently figured that if a formula's good enough for one hit it'll do for two. Showing up main man Damon Rochefort's love of old disco with a cruising string backbone and a chorus that, infuriatingly, not one of us here at Record Mirror Towers can successfully trace back to the '70s disco track it was influenced by. 'Just A Groove' has enough sass to follow its predecessor. But, Sharon Dee Clarke's vocal and its catchy chart appeal notwithstanding, Nomad will, for better or worse, forever be judged on that anthem."

Track listing

 7" single, Belgium (1991)
A. "Just a Groove" – 3:50
B. "I Don't Wanna Be the Last" – 3:55

 7", UK (1991)
A. "Just a Groove" – 3:50
B. "I Don't Wanna Be the Last" – 3:55

 12", UK (1991)
A. "Just a Groove (Monday Club Remix)
B1. "Just a Groove (DJ's Rule The Mix - Part One)
B2. "Just a Groove (DJ's Rule The Mix - Part Two)

 CD single, Japan (1991)
"Just a Groove" (Club Mix) – 6:19
"Just a Groove" (7" Edit) – 3:59
"Just a Groove" (Vocal Attack) – 6:12
"Just a Groove" (Rave Mix) – 5:36
"Just a Groove" (Monday Club Remix) – 5:35
"Just a Groove" (DJ's Rule The Mix - Part 1) – 5:51
"Just a Groove" (DJ's Rule The Mix - Part 2) – 5:32

 CD single, UK (1991)
"Just a Groove" (7" Edit) – 4:02
"Just a Groove" (Club Mix) – 6:21
"Just a Groove" (Vocal Attack) – 6:10

 CD maxi-single, Belgium (1991)
"Just a Groove" – 3:50
"Just a Groove" (12" Mix) – 6:08
"Just a Groove" (Vocal Attack) – 6:04

 CD maxi-single, Remixes, Germany (1991)
"Just a Groove" (Monday Club Remix) – 5:35
"Just a Groove" (DJ's Rule The Mix - Part 1) – 5:50
"Just a Groove" (DJ's Rule The Mix - Part 2) – 5:31

 Cassette single, UK (1991)
A1. "Just a Groove"
A2. "I Don't Wanna Be the Last"
B1. "Just a Groove"
B2. "I Don't Wanna Be the Last"

Charts

References

1991 singles
1991 songs
Capitol Records singles
Disco songs
EMI Records singles
Hip house songs
British house music songs
Songs written by Steve Mac